The Sam Houston Bearkats college football team represents Sam Houston State University as a member of Conference USA (C-USA). The Bearkats competes as part of the NCAA Division I Football Bowl Subdivision. The program has had 15 head coaches since it began play during the 1912 season. Since January 2014, K. C. Keeler has served as head coach at Sam Houston.

Since 1912, four coaches have led Sam Houston in postseason appearances: Paul Pierce, Ron Randleman, Willie Fritz, and Keeler. Four of those coaches also won conference championships: J. W. Jones captured one as a member of the Texas Intercollegiate Athletic Association; Pierce captured four as a member of the Lone Star Conference; Randleman captured two as a member of the Gulf Star Conference; and Randleman captured three, Fritz two, and Keeler four as a member of the Southland Conference. The Bearkats also won national championships under Pierce in 1964 (NAIA) and under Keeler in 2020–21 (FCS).

Randleman is the leader in seasons coached and games won, with 131 victories during his 23 years with the program. Keeler has the highest winning percentage with .759, and Billy Tidwell has the lowest winning percentage with .274.

Key

Coaches

Notes

References 

Sam Houston

Sam Houston Bearkats football coaches